Orchids and My Love is a 1966 Taiwanese film. It won six awards at the 5th Golden Horse Film Festival, including Best Feature Film and Best Director for Lee Chia. The film drew attention for its embodiment of Confucian ethics, in comparison to Beautiful Duckling.

Plot
Young Meng Rou-lan (Tse Ling-ling) loves ballet, but cannot perform as she has polio. She is raised by her father (Ko Hsiang-ting) on an orchid farm. His unconditional love sees Meng through her recovery. As she matures to adulthood (Tang Pao-yun), Meng learns to treasure her independence.

References

1966 films
Films about families
Taiwanese romantic drama films